Percy Barlow  (18 June 1905 – 23 July 1981) was a British-born American soccer center forward who played professionally in the American Soccer League.

Barlow was born in England, the son of 	Fred Barlow and Anna Wood. The family arrived in the United States when he was age 5 and settled in Fall River, Massachusetts, where his father worked in a thread factory. By age 14, Percy was also working in the factory.

In August 1927, Barlow signed with the Fall River Marksmen of the American Soccer League.  In 1927, he moved to J&P Coats for two seasons.  In 1929, the team became the Pawtucket Rangers under new management.  In 1930, Barlow played for the New Bedford Whalers.

He died in Fall River in 1981.

References

External links

 

1905 births
1981 deaths
People from Mossley
British emigrants to the United States
American soccer players
American Soccer League (1921–1933) players
Fall River Marksmen players
J&P Coats players
New Bedford Whalers players
Pawtucket Rangers players
Association football forwards